Livermore Municipal Airport  is three miles west of Livermore, California, in Alameda County, California. The Federal Aviation Administration (FAA) National Plan of Integrated Airport Systems for 2017–2021 categorized it as a regional reliever facility.

The airport has no scheduled airline service; the closest commercial airports are Oakland International Airport and San Jose International Airport. In the 1976-1977 OAG the regional airline California Air Commuter had scheduled service listed at Livermore, using Piper Navajos.

Facilities

It has two asphalt runways:
7L/25R is 5,253 by 100 feet (1,601 × 30m). Is approved for instrument approaches.
7R/25L is 2,699 by 75 feet (823 × 23m). It was built in 1985 and is used mainly for training.

In the year ending May 1, 2018 the airport had 148,153 aircraft operations, average 424 per day: 98% general aviation, 1% air taxi, <1% airline and <1% military. In September 2018, 461 aircraft were based at this airport: 417 single-engine, 33 multi-engine, 6 jet, and 5 helicopter.

Besides the  terminal building, built in 2015, there are nearly 400 aircraft storage hangar units, a corporate-style hangar building containing  of space and an aircraft storage shelter.

Expansion plans
In 2021 KaiserAir filed a letter of intent to expand to Livermore Municipal Airport:

 Phase One: Concrete apron ( 293,200 square feet), terminal building 5,000 square feet), fuel storage, self- service avgas fuel station, vehicle parking lot and airfield infrastructure improvements
 Phase Two: Hangar complex ( 64,000 square feet), 18 rectangular 60' x60' hangars
 Phase Three: Two-story office building and hangar complex ( 38,000 square feet) and the addition of Boeing 737 operations
 Phase Four: Ground service equipment maintenance building ( 4,000 square feet) and two t-hangar complexes ( 60,000 square feet)

In 2022, local government officials said that it appeared that KaiserAir was "not moving forward" with their originally proposed project.

Accidents and incidents
On February 25, 2021, a private Mooney M20 aircraft crashed onto a car on a nearby freeway overpass. No one was injured, but both the airplane and the car suffered substantial damage.

See also

List of airports in the San Francisco Bay area

References

External links
 
 
 

Livermore, California
Airports in Alameda County, California